German submarine U-45 was a Type VIIB U-boat of Nazi Germany's Kriegsmarine during World War II. She was ordered on 21 November 1936 and laid down on 23 February 1937 at Germaniawerft in Kiel as yard number 580. She was launched on 27 April 1938 and commissioned on 25 June 1938 under the command of Kapitänleutnant (Kptlt.) Alexander Gelhaar.

Design
German Type VIIB submarines were preceded by the shorter Type VIIA submarines. U-45 had a displacement of  when at the surface and  while submerged. She had two shafts and two  propellers.

U-45 was fitted with five  torpedo tubes (four fitted at the bow and one at the stern), fourteen torpedoes, one  SK C/35 naval gun, 220 rounds, and an anti-aircraft gun. The boat had a complement of between forty-four and sixty.

Service history

First war patrol

Her training exercises completed, U-45 left Kiel on her first war patrol on 19 August 1939 (prior to the outbreak of World War II) under the command of Kptlt. Alexander Gelhaar. During 28 days at sea no enemy vessels were attacked and the submarine returned to her base at Kiel on 15 September 1939.

Second war patrol
Sailing again on 9 October 1939 under the command of Kptlt. Alexander Gelhaar, U-45 began her second and final war patrol. This attack yielded the only two successes by U-45, the 9,205 ton British freighter Lochavon and the 10,108 French merchant ship Bretagne. U-45 also attacked but failed to damage the 10,350 ton British steam merchantman Karamea; the single torpedo fired at this ship detonated prematurely (a common problem early in the war).

Fate
All 38 crew members went down with the submarine.

Summary of raiding history

References

Bibliography

External links

German Type VIIB submarines
World War II submarines of Germany
1938 ships
U-boats commissioned in 1938
U-boats sunk in 1939
U-boats sunk by depth charges
U-boats sunk by British warships
World War II shipwrecks in the Atlantic Ocean
Ships built in Kiel
Ships lost with all hands
Maritime incidents in October 1939